Hibbertia velutina is a species of flowering plant in the family Dilleniaceae and is endemic to Queensland. It is a shrub with foliage covered with rosette-like hairs, elliptic leaves, and yellow flowers with thirty to thirty-six stamens arranged in bundles around two densely scaly carpels.

Description
There are thirty to thirty-six stamens arranged in bundles around two densely scaly carpels, each carpel with three or four ovules. Flowering occurs from May to December.

Taxonomy
Hibbertia velutina was first formally described in 1863 by George Bentham from an unpublished description by Robert Brown. Bentham's description was published in Flora Australiensis. The specific epithet (tomentosa) means "velvety".

Distribution and habitat
This hibbertia grows in near-coastal forest or woodland and is apparently restricted to the Byfield National Park.

Conservation status
Hibbertia velutina is classified as "least concern" under the Queensland Government Nature Conservation Act 1992.

See also
List of Hibbertia species

References

velutina
Flora of Queensland
Plants described in 1863
Taxa named by Robert Brown (botanist, born 1773)